Timpul Ghyangul is a village in Sindhupalchok District in the Bagmati Zone of central Nepal. At the time of the 1991 Nepal census it had a population of 2571 and had 591 houses in it.

References

Populated places in Sindhupalchowk District